The 1935 Vuelta a España was the 1st edition of the Vuelta a España, one of cycling's Grand Tours. The race began in Madrid on 29 April 1935 and Stage 7 finished in Tortosa on 6 May. The race as a whole finished back in Madrid on 15 May 1935.

Stage 1
29 April 1935 - Madrid to Valladolid,

Stage 2
30 April 1935 - Valladolid to Santander,

Stage 3
1 May 1935 - Santander to Bilbao,

Stage 4
2 May 1935 - Bilbao to San Sebastián,

Stage 5
3 May 1935 - San Sebastián to Zaragoza,

Stage 6
4 May 1935 - Zaragoza to Barcelona,

Stage 7
6 May 1935 - Barcelona to Tortosa,

References

1935 Vuelta a España
Vuelta a España stages